Richard Goodman (born July 11, 1945) is an American writer of nonfiction.  He lives in Lafayette, Louisiana. He is the author of four books of nonfiction.  His articles and essays have appeared in the Harvard Review, Ascent, Vanity Fair, The New York Times, Creative Nonfiction, French Review, and The Michigan Quarterly Review, among others. He was educated at the University of Michigan, where he won a Hopwood Award and received a B.A.; at Wayne State University, where he received his M.A.; and at Spalding University, where he received his M.F.A.

Bibliography

The Bicycle Diaries 2011
A New York Memoir 2010
The Soul of Creative Writing 2008
French Dirt: The Story of a Garden in the South of France 1991/2002

References

External links

 Poets & Writers Directory
 MacDowell Colony Artists
 Authors Guild profile

Living people
1945 births
American male non-fiction writers
Spalding University alumni
University of Michigan alumni
Wayne State University alumni
University of New Orleans faculty
Hopwood Award winners